David Hofer (born 21 June 1983) is an Italian cross-country skier who has competed since 2002. At the 2010 Winter Olympics in Vancouver, he finished 39th in the individual sprint and 53rd in the 15 km + 15 km double pursuit events.

At the FIS Nordic World Ski Championships 2009 in Liberec, Hofer finished 37th in the 50 km and 58th in the 15 km events.

Cross-country skiing results
All results are sourced from the International Ski Federation (FIS).

Olympic Games

World Championships

World Cup

Season standings

Individual podiums

1 podium – (1 )

Team podiums

 2 podiums – (2 )

References

External links
 

1983 births
Cross-country skiers at the 2010 Winter Olympics
Cross-country skiers at the 2014 Winter Olympics
Germanophone Italian people
Italian male cross-country skiers
Tour de Ski skiers
Living people
Olympic cross-country skiers of Italy
Sportspeople from Bolzano
Cross-country skiers of Centro Sportivo Carabinieri
20th-century Italian people
21st-century Italian people